Horacio Martínez Meza (born 15 May 1972) is a Mexican politician affiliated with the Party of the Democratic Revolution. As of 2014 he served as Deputy of the LIX Legislature of the Mexican Congress representing the Federal District.

References

1972 births
Living people
Politicians from Mexico City
Party of the Democratic Revolution politicians
Universidad Autónoma Metropolitana alumni
Members of the Congress of Mexico City
21st-century Mexican politicians
Deputies of the LIX Legislature of Mexico
Members of the Chamber of Deputies (Mexico) for Mexico City